Jerry Joseph Mackey (born September 20, 1984 in New York City) is a former American football linebacker. He was signed by the Tampa Bay Buccaneers as an undrafted free agent in 2007. He played college football at Syracuse.

Mackey has also been a member of the New York Jets.

Early years
PrepStar All-American … Rated the No. 8 prospect in New York by SuperPrep … New York Sportswriters Association First-team Class AA All-State as a senior and junior … All-Nassau County and All-Long Island as a senior … Received the Bill Piner Award as outstanding linebacker in Nassau County in 2001 … Had 85 tackles, 51 solo, one sack, two forced fumbles and three fumbles recoveries as a senior

College career
Mackey was a 3-year starter at Syracuse at the Linebacker position. His sophomore year, he posted a career high 106 tackles. Though Mackey suffered a major shoulder injury late in his junior campaign and registered just 29 tackles that year. Mackey wore jersey #57 at Syracuse.

Personal
Jerry is the nephew of former NFL tight end John Mackey.

External links
Syracuse Orange bio

1984 births
Living people
Players of American football from New York City
American football linebackers
Syracuse Orange football players
Tampa Bay Buccaneers players
New York Jets players